Al-Kadhimiya Mosque or Al-Kadhimayn Shrine is a Shi'ite Islamic mosque and shrine located in the Kādhimayn suburb of Baghdad, Iraq. It contains the tombs of the seventh and ninth Twelver Shī'ī Imāms, respectively Mūsā al-Kāẓim and his grandson Muhammad al-Jawad. Also buried within the premises of this mosque are the historical scholars Shaykh Mufīd and Shaykh Naṣīr ad-Dīn aṭ-Ṭūsi. Directly adjacent to the mosque are two smaller shrines, belonging to the brothers Sayyid Raḍī (who compiled Nahjul-Balāghah) and Sayyid Murtadā and Qadi Abu Yusuf al-Ansari.

History

The mosque is built on the site of the Qureish cemetery, which was created with the original Round City of Baghdad in 762 AD. This cemetery became the burial site of the seventh Twelver imam Musa al-Kadhim in 799 AD, followed by his grandson, the ninth imam Muhammad al-Jawad, in 834 AD. The current building dates to the restoration carried out by the Safavid shah Ismail I from 1502–1524. It was further ornamented by the Ottoman sultan Suleiman the Magnificent after he conquered Baghdad in 1534. Since then, it has continued to be kept in a state of good repair.

Repairs and maintenance

Inner structure

Repairs to the crumbling structure of the main courtyard of the mosque and its surrounding rooms were carried out in three phases, spanning a period of four months, before the end of 2007. The project entailed the stripping off of the old crumbling walls throughout the courtyard, the addition of various reinforcements to the walls and ceilings, as well as maintenance on the electrical wirings throughout the mosque. Once the inner structure was completed, the floors and walls were then plated in various kinds of marble. Updates to the cooling units of the mosque began in late 2008, and new water filtration units were installed on November 28, 2008.

Construction on the new ladies entrance to the mosque, that is Bāb al-Fāṭimah, began in late 2008, along with the construction work for new rooms to the mosque meant for serving refreshments to pilgrims.

Outer structure
Among the earliest of repairs done to the mosque, after the fall of the regime of Saddam Hussein, were repairs done to one of the entrance gates of the mosque known as Bāb al-Qiblah. The gate and the outer wall had to be entirely refurbished because of the severe neglect they had withstood, and took seven months to complete, having started in early September 2006.

The golden dome over the grave of Muhammad at-Taqī was re-gilded and unveiled to the public in March 2008, during the birthday celebrations of Muhammad and his descendant, Ja‘far as-Sādiq. Repair work on the dome over the grave of Mūsā al-Kādhim began in early August 2008, during the birthday ceremonies of Husayn ibn ‘Alī, ‘Abbās ibn ‘Alī, and ‘Alī ibn Husayn.

Recent timeline

Gallery

See also

 Holiest sites in Shia Islam
 Iraqi art
 List of mosques in Baghdad
 Mesopotamia in the Quran
 Shia Islam in Iraq

References

External links

 History of the Shrine at Kadhimayn

Shia shrines
Kadhimiya
Mausoleums in Iraq
Tourist attractions in Iraq
Mosques in Baghdad
Safavid architecture
Islamic holy places
Shrines in Iraq
Al-Kadhimayn